Gognies-Chaussée is a commune in the Nord department in northern France. It lies on the border with Belgium, adjacent to the Belgian village Gœgnies-Chaussée.

Heraldry

See also
Communes of the Nord department

References

Gognieschaussee
Belgium–France border crossings